Alfa Matrix is a Belgian record label. Founded in 2001, the label releases musical styles including aggrotech, industrial music, dark elektro, synthpop, and electronica.

Based in Brussels, the label consists of label and artists manager Séba Dolimont, promo manager Bernard Van Isacker, and head of design Benoît Blanchart. The label celebrated its 20th anniversary with a compilation release matriXX – 20 Years of Alfa Matrix in December 2021.

Artists

32CRASH
Acylum
Adam X
Agonised by Love
!AïBoFoRcEn<-
amGod
Alien Vampires
Armageddon Dildos
Aesthetische
Avarice In Audio
Ayria (Previously)
Bruderschaft
Cosmic Armchair
Crisk
Cynical Existence
Diffuzion
Digital Factor
Diskonnekted
Dream Recall
DR. Kövald
Dunkelwerk
Einheit Meister 08.11.81
Entrzelle
Epsilon Minus
Essence of Mind
Freakangel
Front 242
Glis
Halo In Reverse
HausHetaere
Headscan
Helalyn Flowers
Hungry Lucy
Implant
Inure
I:Scintilla
Junksista
Klutæ
Kant Kino
Komor Kommando
Krystal System
Leæther Strip
Lovelorn Dolls
Malakwa (Band)
Male or Female
Mari Chrome
Mentallo and the Fixer
Metroland
Mind:state
Miseria Ultima
Mnemonic
Mondträume
Monolith
Nebula-H
Neikka RPM
Nitzer Ebb
Növö
O.V.N.I.
Plastic Noise Experience
Prozium
Psy'Aviah
Razorfade
Regenerator
Reichsfeind
Schwarzblut
SD-KRTR (Simon Carter)
Seize
Sero.Overdose
Simon Carter (SD-KRTR)
Star Industry
Stray
Studio-X
Suicidal Romance
Suicide Inside
Tamtrum
Technoir
Trisomie 21
Unter Null
Venal Flesh
Virgins O.R. Pigeons
Virtual><Embrace
XMH
Zombie Girl

Compilation albums
Square Matrix 003 (2003; featuring Plastic Noise Experience, Glis, Neikka RPM and Regenerator)
Square Matrix 004 (2004; featuring Glis, Seize, Ayria and Dunkelwerk)

External links

References

Belgian record labels
Record labels established in 2001
Synth-pop record labels
Electronic music record labels